The New Masquerade was a Nigerian sitcom that aired on the Nigerian Television Network on Tuesday nights from 8:30pm – 9:00pm during the 1980s until the mid-1990s. It was created and written by James Iroha who also acted in the sitcom. It is one of Nigeria's longest running sitcoms.  The TV show started out as radio program known as The Masquerade transmitted on the East Central State Broadcasting Corporation, Enugu.

Synopsis
The show started out a segment called Masquerade aired on In the Lighter Mood, radio program of the East Central Broadcasting Corporation. It was created after the civil war as a means to bring laughter to the homes of citizens after the devastation caused by the Nigerian Civil War.  The creator was James Iroha who also played Giringori on the TV show.

The protagonist of the show is Chief Zebrudaya, a World War II veteran who has visited various foreign countries and he is perceived by other characters to have attained some level of sophistication and enlightenment. Many of the shows' plot take place in Zebrudaya's sitting room. Zebrudaya has a wife, Ovuleria, a daughter, Philo and two houseboys, Clarus and Giringori. Though a comedy, the show also incorporate melodramatic plots about teaching morals and the consequences of some of society's problems if they are not corrected.

Cast and characters
 Chika Okpala as Zebrudaya - also known by his alias 4:30 is a domineering husband; he has a range of experience as an ex-serviceman and resident in foreign countries. He uses a mixture of Queens English, Igbo language and Pidgin English as a means of communication
 Lizzy Evoeme as Ovuleria - Zebrudaya's submissive wife who takes care of the house and engages in petty trading
 Claude Eke as Jegede Sokoya - Zeburudaya's friend whose arrogance and the quest for easy money is a source of conflict between him and the more honest Zeburudaya. He calls himself a doctor and the youngest millionaire in the universe. He likes to demonstrate his ability to speak in Queens English by using a bombast or pretentious style of speaking, albeit with a thick Yoruba accent.
James Iroha as Giringory Akabogu - Houseboy, speaks in Pidgin English. Iroha was also the creator of the sitcom.
 Christy Essien-Igbokwe as Apena  - Sokoya's wife. 
 David Ofor as Clarus - Giringory's fellow houseboy

References

Nigerian comedy television series
Nigerian Television Authority original programming